Zheng Shuang (born Zheng Yihan; 22 August 1991) is a Chinese actress. She rose to fame with her role as Chu Yuxun in Meteor Shower (2009–2010), becoming the youngest actress to be nominated for Best Actress at the China TV Golden Eagle Award. In 2016, she starred in the hit romance comedy drama Love O2O.

Zheng was also chosen by Southern Metropolis Daily as one of the "Four Dan Actresses of the post-90s Generation" (Chinese: 90后四小花旦), along with Zhou Dongyu, Guan Xiaotong and Yang Zi.

On 20 January 2021, Zheng was found guilty of tax evasion (a total of ). Coupled with her surrogacy scandal, she was labelled as "actors with poor conduct" by the Chinese state regulators, therefore being blacklisted and banned from all public appearances with all existing public activities relating to her entertainment career being forced to cancel.

Education 
Zheng Shuang received a bachelor of arts with a major in performance from Beijing Film Academy in 2011.

Career

2009–2013: Acting debut and rising popularity 
In 2009, Zheng Shuang made her debut in Meteor Shower, Hunan TV's remake of the hit Taiwanese drama Meteor Garden. The drama was a major hit in China, and shot Zheng to instant fame. She also released a single, "Love Waltz" for the OST. Zheng was nominated for the Best Actress award at the 25th China TV Golden Eagle Award, becoming the youngest actress to be nominated. Zheng subsequently reprised her role in the second season of the drama which aired in 2010.

In 2011, Zheng starred in Gordon Chan's fantasy film, Mural, which won her the Best New Actress award at the Hong Kong Film Directors' Guild Award. The same year she starred in action comedy film  No Limit, and historical romance drama War of Desire.

In 2012, Zheng portrayed double roles in the historical drama Secret History of Princess Taiping, playing Princess Taiping and Princess Andingsi. In 2013, she starred in fashion romance drama The Queen of SOP 2, the sequel to the 2011 hit drama.

2014–2020: Rising Popularity 
In 2014, Zheng starred in the hit fantasy action drama Swords of Legends, where she played a  fox spirit. The popularity of the drama led to renewed recognition for Zheng, and she won the Audience's Favorite Actress award at the 13th Huading Awards.

In 2015, Zheng starred in her first period drama, The Cage of Love penned by Tong Hua. She won the Best Actress award in the Revolutionary-Era drama category for her performance at the 19th Huading Awards. The same year, she starred alongside Jing Boran in  Love Weaves Through a Millennium, a remake of the South Korean time-travel romance drama Queen In-hyun's Man; and joined the travel-reality show Divas Hit the Road. With her high press coverage and successful works, Zheng won the Popular Actress award at the 1st China Television Drama Quality Ceremony.

In 2016, Zheng starred in the historical melodrama Chronicle of Life, based on the novel Lonely Courtyard in Late Spring by Fei Wo Si Cun. She then portrayed Ding Yuehua in the historical mystery drama The Three Heroes and Five Gallants, based on the 19th-century classic novel of the same name.
The same year, Zheng co-starred with Yang Yang in romance comedy drama Love O2O, based on the novel of the same name by Gu Man. The drama was a major hit both domestically and internationally, leading to increased popularity for Zheng.

In 2017, Zheng starred alongside Chen Xuedong in Rush to the Dead Summer, a youth melodrama adapted from Guo Jingming's novel of the same name. The drama was praised for its realistic portrayal of youth and campus life, as well as its beautiful cinematography. She also co-starred in fantasy-adventure film Wu Kong, her first film in six years.

In 2018, Zheng starred alongside Luo Jin in the romance drama My Story for You. The same year, she participated in the creation of the script for science fiction romance drama Hi, I'm Saori, which she stars in. Forbes China listed Zheng under their 30 Under 30 Asia 2017 list which consisted of 30 influential people under 30 years old who have had a substantial effect in their fields.

In 2019, Zheng starred in the female-centric youth drama Youth Fight directed by Zhao Baogang. The same year she starred in romance melodrama River Flows To You alongside Ma Tianyu, based on Guo Jingming's novel Cry Me A Sad River. Zheng was set to star in spy drama Secret Keepers  where she played double roles as an undercover agent and a Japanese spy. Secret Keepers was due to be released on 5 September 2020, but it was abruptly halted and postponed indefinitely on 2 September 2020. The postponement was due to a general blacklist by the state regulators on a co-actor, Zhao Lixin which meant that the production team had to edit Zhao out from the drama.

2021–present: Career stoppage

Surrogacy scandal 
In January 2021, it was revealed that Zheng had two children born of surrogacy in the United States and had allegedly first demanded late term abortion at 7 months into the pregnancies and expressed annoyance when informed that it was illegal, then abandoned them after her relationship with their father turned sour. Surrogacy is not allowed in China, but due to legal loopholes, some Chinese citizens would seek to have children via surrogate mothers overseas. News of people resorting to surrogacy would usually face significant backlash in China.

Upon the release of the news, many brands started to drop her. Prada subsequently dropped her as their spokesperson due to the "significant recent media coverage" of her "personal life". Some, including London jewellery brand Lola Rose, Chinese cosmetics brand Chioture and hair care brand Aussie, had distanced themselves from her while others had deleted social media posts that had promoted her. Many of her fanclubs had also deleted content of her with fans deserting her.

The scandal drew attention of the state regulators, releasing statements through various state media platforms criticising Zheng's use of surrogacy and labelled her as a 'problematic artiste'. Through the state regulators, Zheng has since been blacklisted on 20 January 2021, with all existing entertainment activities relating to her being forced to be cancelled. Various producers when asked anonymously, said that no programmes would want to engage Zheng in the future. Awards won at the 13th and 19th Huading Awards were also rescinded by the awarding committee.

On February 20, Meituan Waimai, a Chinese shopping platform, classified "Zheng Shuang" as a sensitive word. If users fill in "Zheng Shuang" as the recipient or picker, they were not able to order food.

Tax evasion 
In April 2021, Zhang Heng revealed his chat history with Zheng Shuang and her mother, showing Zheng received  ( million) salary for an unreleased TV series, A Chinese Ghost Story. China had introduced laws in 2018 to regulate the highest possible salary for an actor by pegging their salary between 40%-70% of a film's production costs. This sparked an investigation into Zheng for possible tax evasion. In order to salvage the TV series, the production team decided to swap Zheng's face throughout the series with Peng Xiaoran's.

On 27 August 2021, it was reported that Zheng drew  for A Chinese Ghost Story, and had underdeclared her income from it through a 'yin-yang contract' setup. Zheng was charged with tax evasion by China's State Taxation Administration and ordered to pay  ( million) as penalty for alleged tax evasion. Of the amount to be paid, Zheng had paid the evaded taxes and late fees, with the fine outstanding. Zhang was the agent suspected of facilitating the arrangement, and is currently being investigated for his role in the matter. The National Radio and Television Administration also ordered that all programs that Zheng had participated in, including A Chinese Ghost Story, to be taken off air.

Personal life 
In May 2018, Zheng Shuang met producer Zhang Heng when filming a reality show. The pair admitted to be dating in August 2018 and started a company together. The pair exchanged wedding vows in United States on 19 January 2019. However, they announced their breakup in December 2019. On 18 January 2021, Zhang revealed that he had been stranded in the US for over a year to take care of two children. The two children were born to US-based surrogate mothers on 19 December 2019 and 4 January 2020. Both Zhang and Zheng have since confirmed that they were the parents of the children. Zhang alleged that Zheng had abandoned the two children after breaking up and not wanting to sign legal papers which would allow the children to travel to China. Zheng had denied the allegations, and instead alleged Zhang was cheating on her in September 2019 and returned to China.

The fertility clinic which Zheng engaged is reportedly owed US$68,000 for the successful surrogacy. The clinic also reportedly confirmed Zheng's request to terminate the pregnancies at the seventh month, which was denied. The clinic further alleged that she wanted to pay them monthly to raise the children in the United States, instead of wanting to bring the children back to China.

She and her family also claimed that she did not abandon the children and had in fact been making arrangements since 2019 to fight for custody. On 23 January 2021, Zheng's father revealed in a video recording that the conversation which circulated online was made when Zheng and Zhang just broke up; the family just wanted to find all means to cut Zhang off from Zheng's life, instead of not wanting the children. Zheng's father also mentioned that the couple decided on having children via surrogacy due to poor health conditions resulting from Zheng's work, and he apologized for 'not advising Zheng's decision-making process correctly.'

In May 2021, the American court awarded full custody of the two children to Zhang on the basis that the children recognized Zhang as the only parent. At the same time, the court ordered Zheng to undergo treatment to stabilize her mental well-being for 6 months, and mandated Zheng to interact with the children 3 times a week to allow them establish a familial connection.

Filmography

Film

Television series

Short film

Variety show

Music video

Discography

Singles

Bibliography

Awards and nominations

Forbes China Celebrity 100

Notes

References

External links
 Zheng Shuang's Weibo
 

1991 births
Living people
Beijing Film Academy alumni
Actresses from Liaoning
Actresses from Shenyang
Musicians from Shenyang
Singers from Liaoning
Chinese film actresses
Chinese television actresses
Participants in Chinese reality television series
21st-century Chinese women singers
21st-century Chinese actresses